Muttontown is a village located within the Town of Oyster Bay in Nassau County, on Long Island, in New York, United States. The population was 3,497 at the 2010 census.

History 
During colonial times, the area was used to raise sheep for wool and meat. The village was incorporated in 1931. The name of the village stems from its former use as pasturage for sheep.

Zog of Albania bought the local Knollwood Estate in 1951, but sold it in 1955. The Benjamin Moore Estate was listed on the National Register of Historic Places in 1979.

Muttontown was ranked one of the wealthiest towns in America by BusinessWeek.

Geography 

The village lost some territory between the 2000  and 2010 censuses to Syosset.

Demographics

As of the census of 2000, there were 3,412 people, 1,022 households, and 920 families residing in the village. The population density was 560.5 people per square mile (216.3/km2). There were 1,048 housing units at an average density of 172.1 per square mile (66.4/km2). The racial makeup of the village was 79.92% White, 1.82% African American, 16.00% Asian, 0.21% from other races, and 2.05% from two or more races. Hispanic and Latino of any race were 2.29% of the population.

There were 1,022 households, out of which 47.6% had children under the age of 18 living with them, 83.6% were married couples living together, 3.5% had a female householder with no husband present, and 9.9% were non-families. 7.4% of all households were made up of individuals, and 2.5% had someone living alone who was 65 years of age or older. The average household size was 3.34 and the average family size was 3.49.

In the village, the population was spread out, with 29.9% under the age of 18, 5.7% from 18 to 24, 23.4% from 25 to 44, 31.1% from 45 to 64, and 9.8% who were 65 years of age or older. The median age was 40 years. For every 100 females, there were 95.3 males. For every 100 females age 18 and over, there were 91.7 males.

The median income for a household in the village was $184,386, and the median income for a family was $190,358. Males had a median income of $100,000 versus $53,846 for females. The per capita income for the village was $88,020. About 2.0% of families and 3.4% of the population were below the poverty line, including 1.8% of those under age 18 and 4.5% of those age 65 or over.

Education 
Muttontown is served by the Locust Valley Central School District, the Jericho Union Free School District, and the Syosset Central School District. As such, students who attend public schools and reside in Muttontown attend school in one of these three districts depending on where they live in the village.

Notable people
Alicia Keys, singer/songwriter
Al Trautwig, sports commentator
Cliff Josephy, Professional Poker Player
Lester L. Wolff, former member of the United States House of Representatives from New York
Chad Pennington, football quarterback
 Jose Reyes, infielder for the New York Mets

References

External links
 Muttontown official website

Villages in Nassau County, New York
Oyster Bay (town), New York
Villages in New York (state)